Sajja Chaulagain is Nepalese singer who won the title and became the first female winner of Nepalese TV series Nepal Idol. Winner for the season three with Prabin Bedwal as runner up and Kiran Kumar Bhujel as second runner up. Chaulagain was born at Pathari of Morang district. She is the lead vocalist of The Loading Band. Sajja Chaulagain is the daughter of Tanka Bahadur Chaulagain and Geeta Chaulagain.

References

Living people
21st-century Nepalese male singers
People from Morang District
Nepal Idol winners
1997 births
Khas people